Telford Priory School is a coeducational secondary school located in the Wrockwardine Wood area of Telford in Shropshire, England.

The school opened in September 2015 in a new campus, following the merger of Wrockwardine Wood Arts Academy (formerly Wrockwardine Wood Secondary School) and Sutherland Co-operative Academy. The school is sponsored by the Community Academies Trust.

The school facilities include full size 3G Astro with the leisure centre next door holding a 400m athletics track, sports hall, 2 netball courts, fitness suite, dance studio and is located next to an indoor tennis centre and 4 outdoor courts.

Inspection judgements

The school was inspected by Ofsted in 2018, with a judgement of Requires Improvement. As of 2022, the school's most recent inspection was in 2022, also with a judgement of Requires Improvement.

References

Secondary schools in Telford and Wrekin
Academies in Telford and Wrekin
Educational institutions established in 2015
2015 establishments in England
Schools in Telford